J. Maple and Grace Senne Wilson House is a historic home located at Cape Girardeau, Missouri.  It was built in 1903–1904, and is a -story, Colonial Revival style red brick dwelling. It has a hipped roof, a rooftop balustrade, and a central hipped dormer. It features a one-story full-width porch supported by Tuscan order columns and topped with a balustrade and two-story octagonal corner tower.

It was listed on the National Register of Historic Places in 2015.

References

Houses on the National Register of Historic Places in Missouri
Colonial Revival architecture in Missouri
Houses completed in 1904
Houses in Cape Girardeau County, Missouri
National Register of Historic Places in Cape Girardeau County, Missouri